Allahé is an arrondissement in the Zou department of Benin. It is an administrative division under the jurisdiction of the commune of Za-Kpota. According to the population census conducted by the Institut National de la Statistique Benin on February 15, 2002, the arrondissement had a total population of 6,903.

References

Populated places in the Zou Department
Arrondissements of Benin